Igor Griszczuk (born 9 June 1964; born as Ihar Hryščuk) is a Belarusian-Polish retired basketball player and current coach. Born in Minsk, he had a long career in Russia and Poland. His jersey number 12 was retired by Włocławek.

Personal
On 20 February 1998, Griszczuk received the Polish nationality.

References

1964 births
Basketball players from Minsk
Polish basketball coaches
Naturalized citizens of Poland
Polish people of Belarusian descent
Belarusian emigrants to Poland
Belarusian basketball coaches
Polish men's basketball players
Belarusian men's basketball players
Czarni Słupsk coaches
BC Tsmoki-Minsk coaches
KK Włocławek coaches
KK Włocławek players
BC Dynamo Moscow players
Living people